A constitutional referendum was held in South Ossetia on 8 April 2001. The constitutional amendments would impose stricter requirements for presidential candidates, make the Russian language an official language alongside Ossetian, and make the Georgian language an official language in areas with a Georgian majority. The proposals were approved by 60% of voters.

Results

References

2001 referendums
Referendums in South Ossetia
2001 in South Ossetia
2001 in Georgia (country)
Constitutional referendums